Bernero is an Italian surname that may refer to
Adam Bernero (born 1976), American baseball pitcher
Edward Allen Bernero (born 1962), American television writer, producer, and director
Giovanni Battista Bernero (1736–1796), Italian sculptor
Virgil Bernero (born 1964), American politician

See also
16051 Bernero, a minor planet

Italian-language surnames